Thiophosphoryl chloride is an inorganic compound with the formula PSCl3. It is a colorless pungent smelling liquid that fumes in air. It is synthesized from phosphorus chloride and used to thiophosphorylate organic compounds, such as to produce insecticides.

Synthesis
Thiophosphoryl chloride can be generated by several reactions starting from phosphorus trichloride. The most common and practical synthesis, hence used in industrial manufacturing, is directly reacting phosphorus trichloride with excess sulfur at 180 °C.

PCl3 + S → PSCl3

Using this method, yields can be very high after purification by distillation. Catalysts facilitate the reaction at lower temperatures, but are not usually necessary.
Alternatively, it is obtained by combining phosphorus pentasulfide and phosphorus pentachloride.

3 PCl5 + P2S5 → 5 PSCl3

Structure
Thiophosphoryl chloride has tetrahedral molecular geometry and C3v molecular symmetry. According to gas electron diffraction, the phosphorus–sulfur bond length is 1.89 Å and the phosphorus–chlorine bond length is 2.01 Å, while the Cl–P–Cl bond angle is 102°.

Reactions
PSCl3 is soluble in benzene, carbon tetrachloride, chloroform, and carbon disulfide. However, it hydrolyzes rapidly in basic or hydroxylic solutions, such as alcohols and amines, to produce thiophosphates. In water PSCl3 reacts, and contingent on the reaction conditions, produces either phosphoric acid, hydrogen sulfide, and hydrochloric acid or dichlorothiophosphoric acid and hydrochloric acid.

PSCl3 + 4 H2O → H3PO4 + H2S + 3 HCl

PSCl3 + H2O → HOP(S)Cl2 + HCl

PSCl3 is used to thiophosphorylate (add P=S to) organic compounds. This conversion is widely applicable for amines and alcohols, as well as amino alcohols, diols, and diamines. Industrially, PSCl3 is used to produce insecticides, like parathion.

PSCl3 + 2 C2H5OH → (C2H5O)2PSCl + 2 HCl
(C2H5O)2PSCl + NaOC6H4NO2 → (C2H5O)2PSOC6H4NO2 + NaCl

PSCl3 reacts with tertiary amides to generate thioamides. For example:

C6H5C(O)N(CH3)2 + PSCl3 → C6H5C(S)N(CH3)2 + POCl3

When treated with methylmagnesium iodide, it give tetramethyldiphosphine disulfide ([Me2P(S)].2.

References

Phosphorus halides
Thiophosphoryl compounds
Thiochlorides